KKTU-FM (99.5 FM) is a radio station broadcasting a hot adult contemporary format. Licensed to Fallon, Nevada, United States, the station is currently owned by Lahontan Valley Broadcasting Company, LLC and features programming from AP Radio and Jones Radio Network.

References

External links

KTU-FM